Manikala Rai (born 27 November 1988) is a Nepalese ultra runner who now lives in France.

Rai is said to be "Nepal's first international female ultra runner." She won the women's race in the North Face 100k in Hong Kong in December 2013, with a time of 15:37:08.

Rai is also a cross-country skier.

References

External  links

1988 births
Living people
Female ultramarathon runners
Nepalese ultramarathon runners
Nepalese female cross-country skiers
Cross-country skiers at the 2017 Asian Winter Games
Rai people